Welcome to the New Cold World is an Album by Lights Action. It was released worldwide on March 2, 2009 as a digital download only, with the option to buy a CD version through the band's website.

Track listing

Information of Value

Funding

The album was produced and mastered on a slim budget of around £15k. Much of the recording costs of the album were funded through the investment engine "SliceThePie".

Recording
The band spent the vast majority of 2008 writing and recording the album. Over 18 tracks were recorded for the album, the band choosing 10 to make the final cut.

Dirty Pretty Strings
The London-based string quartet "Dirty Pretty Strings" feature on four of the songs on the album. "Signals to Radar", "Young Scarlett Young", "I Woke Up in a Civil War" and "Black Feathers". 
Dirty Pretty Strings have worked with bands such as The Enemy, Lightspeed Champion and Ed Harcourt.

"The Bottom of the Sea" choir
The final track on the record features a choir vocal in the chorus. The vocals were recorded in various locations around the UK and feature the voices of the band themselves, along with Singer/songwriter Richard Walters, Dallas Green of Alexisonfire/City and Colour, Kenny Bridges of Moneen, and all of the Oxford Band A Silent Film.

Credits

Patrick Currier - vocals, Cover Illustration
Karl Bareham - Guitar, Art Direction & Design
Chris Moorhead - Guitar/Keys/String Arrangement
Alex Leeder - Bass
Steven Durham - drums/String Arrangement
Richard Wilkinson - Producer, Mixing (At The Pierce Rooms/Mayfair)
Doug Shearer - Mastering (At Pierce Entertainment)
Dirty Pretty Strings - Session string quartet
Dallas Green - Guest vocals (on "Bottom of the Sea")
Kenny Bridges - Guest vocals (on "Bottom of the Sea")
Richard Walters - Guest vocals (on "Bottom of the Sea")
Rob Stevenson - Guest vocals (on "Bottom of the Sea")
Spencer Walker - Guest vocals (on "Bottom of the Sea")
Ali Hussain - Guest vocals (on "Bottom of the Sea")
Lewis Jones - Guest vocals (on "Bottom of the Sea")
Darren Heelis - Assistant Engineer (At The Pierce Rooms)
Ben Bell - Mayfair Assistant
Toshi Minesaki - Mayfair Assistant
Dougal Lott - Konk Assistant
Emma Hampson-Jones - Band Photography
iheartstudios - still life photography
Paul Russell for P Russell & Co - Legal
Matt Hughes for Devil PR - UK Press

References

2009 albums
Lights Action albums